Zhang Cunbiao (born 11 February 1969) is a Chinese former track and field athlete who competed in the discus throw. He was the 1994 Asian Games champion in the event.

Zhang first came to prominence at national level with a win at the 1993 Chinese Athletics Championships. This made him the third successive Chinese to win the men's discus, succeeding Zhang Jinglong and Li Weinan to extend China's win streak to five editions. He declined at national level in the subsequent season's, with Ma Wei and Li Shaojie becoming the country's leading discus men.

Fellow Chinese Li was the winner of the event.

Zhang won the second and final national title of his career in 1998. This earned him a place on the Chinese team to defend his title at the 1998 Asian Games. He fell short of his 1994 performance and left the competition with the bronze medal, while Li succeeded him as Asian Games champion. This was the last major international appearance by Zhang, but he continued to compete well at national level into his thirties, claiming fourth at the 2001 Chinese National Games and second at the 2005 Chinese Championships four years later.

National titles
Chinese Athletics Championships
Discus throw: 1993, 1998

International competitions

References

External links



Living people
1969 births
Chinese male discus throwers
Asian Games gold medalists for China
Asian Games bronze medalists for China
Asian Games medalists in athletics (track and field)
Athletes (track and field) at the 1994 Asian Games
Athletes (track and field) at the 1998 Asian Games
Medalists at the 1994 Asian Games
Medalists at the 1998 Asian Games
20th-century Chinese people